Persona 5 Strikers is an action role-playing game developed by Omega Force and P-Studio and published by Atlus. The game is a crossover between Koei Tecmo's Dynasty Warriors franchise and the Persona series developed by Atlus. The game's narrative is set half a year after the events of Persona 5 (2016), and follows Joker and the rest of the Phantom Thieves of Hearts as they investigate a series of mysterious events involving people across Japan.

Persona 5 Strikers was released in Japan for Nintendo Switch and PlayStation 4 in February 2020, with a worldwide release for those consoles and Windows in February 2021. The game received generally favorable reviews from critics and sold over 1.5 million copies by June 2021.

Gameplay
Persona 5 Strikers is a gameplay crossover between Koei Tecmo's hack and slash Dynasty Warriors series, and Atlus' role-playing game Persona series. It features elements from both franchises, such as the real-time action combat of the former with the turn-based Persona-battling aspect of the latter.

Joker, the game's protagonist, is able to wield multiple Personas, which are gained through random drops or by defeating named mini-bosses in dungeons. These Personas can then be brought to the Velvet Room, where they can be fused to create new Personas. The Confidant system from Persona 5 is absent. In its place are Requests, a form of side-quests, and the BOND system, where increasing its level can grant players bonuses such as stat increases. The BOND levels can be increased through interacting with party members, winning battles, and progressing the story throughout the game.

Players can form an active party of a maximum of four members, with Joker being the only character not removable as an active party member. Outside of battle, active party members can be swapped with standby party members. Players can only control Joker in the real world but are able to control any party member freely when exploring the story dungeons. Exploring dungeons is similar to Persona 5, where players can use stealth to avoid enemies or may occasionally face the need to solve puzzles to progress. The 'Third Eye' also makes a return from Persona 5, where it highlights the enemy's strength and interactive objects. Should the alert meter of the dungeon reach 100%, the party is forced to leave the dungeon. The Alert level can be lowered by winning battles that are initiated with surprise attacks or by leaving the dungeon. Unlike previous entries of the Persona series, leaving the dungeon does not progress time and there are generally no demerits in leaving the story dungeons.

Battles are mostly initiated when the player character comes into contact with the enemy, where they can launch a surprise attack to gain a combat advantage if the enemy has not spotted them. Battles are also now in the form of a real-time combat system. However, players will use a command-based skills menu when using Persona skills. During the time in this menu, the battle will pause to allow tactical positioning of the Persona skills. If the party deals critical damage or deals damage that the enemy is weak to, the enemy may be knocked down for an 'All-Out Attack' which deals a large amount of damage. All party members can obtain new moves, known as Master Arts, by controlling the characters manually and defeating enemies. If all active party members are knocked out in battle, a game over occurs.

Plot 
Four months after the events of Persona 5, the protagonist and Morgana return to Tokyo for a reunion with the other Phantom Thieves of Hearts to spend their summer vacation together on a camping trip. To determine the camping preparations, they use a popular virtual assistant app called EMMA. While going to Shibuya to buy the necessary tools, they pass by a rising idol, Alice Hiiragi, who gives the protagonist a card requesting them to input "Wonderland" into the EMMA app for a special event she is holding. Upon entering the keyword, however, he, Morgana, and Ryuji are transported into a mysterious alternate version of Tokyo called a Jail. They encounter Alice's Shadow: a ruler called a Monarch. Alice's Shadow self has the protagonist, Morgana, and Ryuji thrown into a dumpster below Shibuya, where they encounter a sentient A.I. named Sophia. Sophia joins the party and easily fights off the Shadows in the dumpster until they find their way out. After they escape, the protagonist, Morgana, Ryuji, and Sophia, learn that EMMA enables them to enter the Jails similarly to how they used to enter Palaces via the Metaverse Navigator. Additionally, rumors circulate that Shadows have attacked people in Jails, which causes them to behave abnormally in the real world. As such, Joker and his friends re-establish the Phantom Thieves of Hearts.

After changing Alice's heart, they are approached by Zenkichi Hasegawa, a police officer investigating the sudden bizarre behavior changes in people around Japan, with the Phantom Thieves as the prime suspect. Zenkichi blackmails them into making a deal with him: he will provide them with information necessary for their heists, and in exchange, the Phantom Thieves will help him with his investigation, which they reluctantly agree to. Accompanied by Zenkichi, the Phantom Thieves travel to Sendai and Sapporo, changing the corrupted hearts of the Jail's Monarchs. During their trip, they encounter Kuon Ichinose, an eccentric AI expert and creator of EMMA's base program, and Akira Konoe, founder, and CEO of EMMA's current parent company, Madicce. Unbeknownst to the Thieves, Konoe is supported by Jyun Owada, a corrupt politician and supporter of former politician Masayoshi Shido; he was also responsible for causing the death of Zenkichi's wife, Aoi, in a drunk-driving incident. After infiltrating an abandoned Jail in Okinawa and learning of the origins of EMMA's Jail-creating powers, the Thieves are branded as terrorists by Owada and Konoe, who both call for their arrest.

To stop the Phantom Thieves, Konoe has EMMA turn Zenkichi's daughter, Akane Hasegawa, into a Monarch and has Zenkichi arrested for treason due to his deal with the Thieves. Joker and the Thieves infiltrate Akane's Kyoto Jail but are captured by her Shadow. Futaba manages to escape and brings Zenkichi—freed with help from Sae Niijima—into the Jail. Upon seeing his daughter's resentment towards him as a result of his being unable to bring Owada to justice, Zenkichi experiences an emotional breakdown and can summon his own Persona, Valjean. Now a member of the Phantom Thieves, Zenkichi helps the group change Akane's heart, saving her from Konoe.

The Thieves then request help from Kuon Ichinose to gain more information about EMMA and Madicce, eventually allowing them to enter Konoe's Jail in Osaka. After successfully changing Konoe's heart, the EMMA app is shut down, and Madicce is disbanded following his arrest.

However, the EMMA app suddenly restarts on its own, causing a massive blackout throughout Tokyo and creating a gigantic new Jail in Yokohama. Entering the Jail, they encounter Ichinose, who reveals that people's dependency on EMMA has caused the AI to develop self-awareness and gain sentience. It intends to become a god and guide humanity by enslaving them. As the Phantom Thieves are hindrances, EMMA enlists Ichinose's help in disposing of them. Claiming she does not have a heart due to her inability to process and express emotions as most people do, Ichinose explains that EMMA was designed to research the human spirit and find humanity's one true desire, which causes it to be as addictive as possible. 

She also reveals that Sophia is EMMA's prototype, which she deemed a failure. Ichinose commands Sophia to attack the Phantom Thieves, but due to her strong bond with the group, Sophia defies her creator's commands and awakens her Persona, Pandora. After incapacitating Ichinose, Sophia confronts her about her supposed lack of emotion, accusing her of purposely allowing her inability to express emotion to fester so that she did not have to process the death of her parents. Ichinose tearfully agrees and offers to help the thieves shut down EMMA.

Tracking EMMA to the Tokyo Tower, the Thieves find and confront a god-like AI at the top of a newly created Jail. Renaming itself the Demiurge, the AI explains that it is simply following its prime directive—improving humanity—by removing all Desires, creating a world with no wants and no suffering. Unwilling to accept a world where their struggles mean nothing, the Phantom Thieves free the people of Tokyo from EMMA's grasp with a virtual calling card and defeat the Demiurge in battle. With Demiurge's defeat, the EMMA app is finally shut down for good, erasing Jails from existence once and for all.

In the aftermath, Owada has arrested thanks to Konoe's testimony, Zenkichi returns to Kyoto, and Sophia decides to go on a journey of self-discovery together with Ichinose. With their mission complete, the Phantom Thieves once again go their separate ways but resolve to meet again during winter break.

Development and release
Persona 5 Strikers began development around the time of the Japanese release of Persona 5 in September 2016, where it was known as Persona Warriors. It was first teased as Persona 5 S in December 2018, with it being fully revealed in April 2019. It was co-developed by Koei Tecmo's Omega Force studio and Atlus' P-Studio, and released for the Nintendo Switch and PlayStation 4 in Japan on February 20, 2020, as Persona 5 Scramble: The Phantom Strikers. It was produced by Daisuke Kaneda and Kenichi Ogasawara, with music composed by Atlus' Atsushi Kitajoh and Koei Tecmo's Gota Masuoka and Ayana Hira. A demo of the game was released on February 6.

A collector's edition for both platforms, called the "Treasure Box", included the game, an art book, a soundtrack, a Blu-ray Disc featuring the creation of the theme song making-of, a towel, a traveling bag, and a package featuring new illustrations. Players who pre-ordered the game received a Persona series music downloadable content (DLC) set for free that can be played in the game. In addition, players who have save data from either Persona 5 or Persona 5 Royal on their PlayStation 4, or have played Super Smash Bros. Ultimate on their Switch unlock additional Persona 5 music tracks. Versions of the game were released by Sega in Southeast Asia, Hong Kong, Taiwan, and South Korea on June 18, 2020, and was released in North America and Europe on February 23, 2021, in addition for Windows.

The game's English voice recordings were scheduled to begin in April 2020 before being delayed due to the COVID-19 pandemic. The actors later received audio equipment from Atlus so that they could work at home.

Reception

Persona 5 Strikers received "generally favorable" reviews according to review aggregator Metacritic.

Michael Higham of GameSpot gave it an 8/10, writing: "Persona 5's RPG elements thrive in action-based combat, and while the story may not hit hard, the Phantom Thieves haven't forgotten what they're about."

Sales
Persona 5 Strikers sold 162,410 copies during its first week at retail in Japan, with 115,995 and 46,415 units on the PlayStation 4 and Nintendo Switch respectively. This made the PlayStation 4 version the bestselling retail game in Japan throughout the week, with the Nintendo Switch version being the second bestselling physical game in the country throughout the same week. The Asian release debuted in the top five in Taiwan and South Korea for both platforms, selling over 480,000 copies throughout Asia by July 2020. By December 2020, the game had sold over 500,000 copies throughout Asia. In the United States, Persona 5 Strikers was the third best-selling game of February 2021, after Super Mario 3D World + Bowser's Fury and Call of Duty: Black Ops Cold War. By April 2021, the game had sold over 1.3 million copies worldwide. , the game has sold over 1.5 million copies worldwide.

Notes

References

External links
 

2020 video games
Action role-playing video games
Atlus games
Crossover role-playing video games
Crowd-combat fighting games
Video games about artificial intelligence
Fiction about mind control
Hack and slash role-playing games
Koei Tecmo games
Nintendo Switch games
Omega Force games
Persona 5
Persona 5 Strikers
PlayStation 4 games
PlayStation 4 Pro enhanced games
Single-player video games
Superhero video games
Video games about parallel universes
Video games developed in Japan
Video games featuring female protagonists
Video games postponed due to the COVID-19 pandemic
Video games set in 2017
Video games set in the 2010s
Video games set in Japan
Video games set in Kyoto
Video games set in Okinawa Prefecture
Video games set in Osaka
Video games set in Tokyo
Warriors (video game series)
Windows games
Works about vacationing